Begonia foliosa is a species of flowering plant in the family Begoniaceae, native to Colombia and Venezuela. The variety commonly cultivated is B. foliosa var. miniata with pink or red flowers. As it does not tolerate temperatures below , in temperate regions it requires winter protection.

The variety B. foliosa var. miniata has gained the Royal Horticultural Society's Award of Garden Merit.

References

foliosa